The North Dakota Library Association (NDLA) is a professional association for librarians, library staff, and library supporters that represent school, public, academic, and special libraries located in North Dakota, United States. "The purpose of this organization is to exercise professional leadership and to promote library services and librarianship." The North Dakota Library Association was formed on January 18, 1906.  The association has humble beginnings – at the 1909 conference, there was only 18 members. There are currently over 300 NDLA members (including academic, health, public, and school libraries).

Executive Board 

The NDLA Executive Board includes 27 members, including: President; President-Elect; Past President; Secretary; Treasurer; American Library Association Councilor; Mountain Plains Library Association Representative; Academic & Special Libraries Section; Government Documents Roundtable; Health Science Information Section; New Members Roundtable; Public Library Section; School & Library Youth Service Section; Technical Services Roundtable; Constitution, Bylaws & Policies; Continuing Education; Finance; Intellectual Freedom; Legislative; Nominations, Elections & Voting; Membership; Professional Development; Public Relations & 2014–26 Executive Secretary; The Good Stuff Editorial; Archivist/Historian; State Librarian; and Web Editor.
The Executive Board is responsible for the transactions of “all business of the North Dakota Library Association”, speaking “for the NDLA membership on national, state, and local library issues”, setting “goals and executes long-range plans for the NDLA”, taking “no position on social issues that do not directly impact libraries” and following “through on directives expressed by NDLA members at the Annual Conference and by section and roundtable decision.”  The Executive Board “meets at least three times a year” and “all meetings are open to the NDLA membership.”

Librarian of the Year Awards 
NDLA awards a Librarian of the Year award annually since 1992 for "notable contributions to the North Dakota library profession, .. significant development of libraries in North Dakota, or .. exemplary statewide service for an extended period of time."

References

External links 
 American Library Association
 Mountain Plains Library Association
 North Dakota Library Association

Library associations in the United States
Library-related professional associations